The philosophers' ships or philosopher's steamboats were steamships that transported intellectuals expelled from Soviet Russia in 1922.

The main load was handled by two German ships, the Oberbürgermeister Haken and the Preussen, which transported more than 200 expelled Russian intellectuals and their families in September and November 1922 from Petrograd (modern-day Saint Petersburg) to the seaport of Stettin in Germany (modern-day Szczecin in Poland). Three detention lists included 228 people, 32 of them students.

Later in 1922, other intellectuals were transported by train to Riga in Latvia or by ship from Odessa to Istanbul.

Among the expelled
Vladimir Abrikosov
Yuly Aikhenvald
Nikolai Berdyaev
Boris Brutskus
Sergei Bulgakov
Valentin Bulgakov
Semyon Frank
Ivan Ilyin
 (university lecturer/publisher; father of architect Anatol Kagan)
Lev Karsavin (the brother of ballerina Tamara Karsavina; arrested again in 1940 and deported to a gulag in Komi, where he died in 1952)

Nikolai Lossky
Mikhail Osorgin
Pitirim Sorokin (train)
Fyodor Stepun

Boris Vysheslavtsev

Literature
Catherine Baird. Revolution from Within: The Ymca in Russia’s Ascension to Freedom from Bolshevik Tyranny, 2013,  (with bio List of the Deported)
Lesley Chamberlain, Lenin's Private War: The Voyage of the Philosophy Steamer and the Exile of the Intelligentsia, St Martin's Press, 2007; 
V. G. Makarov, V. S. Khristoforov: «Passazhiry ‹filosofskogo parokhoda›. (Sud’by intelligencii, repressirovannoj letom-osen’ju 1922g.)». // Voprosy filosofii 7 (600) 2003, p. 113-137 [contains a list with biographical information on Russian intellectuals exiled 1922-1923].

Forced migration in the Soviet Union
1922 in Russia
Persecution by the Soviet Union
Persecution of philosophers
Soviet expellees
White Russian emigration
Russian philosophy